Vorstenbosch is a village of the municipality Bernheze. Bernheze is located in the province of North Brabant, one of the 12 provinces of the Netherlands.

History 
The village was first mentioned in 1485 as Vorsschenbosch. The etymologie of the first word is unclear. It can either mean "front (nearest) forest" or "forest with frogs".

Vorstenbosch was home to 355 people in 1840. The St Lambartus Church dates from 1932.
Before 1994 it formed with Nistelrode the municipality Nistelrode.

Sights 
Interesting things to see:

 Parish church St. Lambertus
 Corn mill "Windlust", completely restored in 2008
 Old lime tree
 Blow dunes in the vicinity (Bedaf)

Gallery

References

External links
 Vorstenbosch local information (in Dutch)

Populated places in North Brabant
Bernheze